Robert Beckwith may refer to:

Rob Beckwith (born 1984), English footballer
Robert Todd Lincoln Beckwith (1904–1985), last surviving undisputed descendant of Abraham Lincoln